Lučany nad Nisou is a town in Jablonec nad Nisou District in the Liberec Region of the Czech Republic. It has about 1,900 inhabitants.

Administrative parts
Villages of Horní Maxov and Jindřichov are administrative parts of Lučany nad Nisou.

Geography
It lies in the Jizera Mountains.

History
The first written mention of Lučany nad Nisou is from 1623. In 1892, the village was promoted to a market town and in 1913, it became a town. After the World War II, Lučany nad Nisou lost its town status, but it was returned to the municipality in 2006.

Transport
Koleje Dolnośląskie D21 line runs from Liberec to Szklarska Poręba via the town.

Sights
There landmark of Lučany nad Nisou is the Church of the Visitation of the Virgin Mary. It was built in the neo-Renaissance style in 1886–1889. The second church in the municipality is the Church of the Sacred Heart of Jesus in Horní Maxov.

There are two observation towers in the municipal territory, Bramberk and Slovanka on the eponymous mountains. There are Stations of the Cross along the way to the top of Slovanka.

References

External links

Cities and towns in the Czech Republic
Populated places in Jablonec nad Nisou District